Cantus may refer to:

 Cantus, an activity organised by Flemish and Dutch and Baltic student organisations and fraternities
 Cantus (database), a database for Latin ecclesiastical chant
 Cantus (vocal ensemble), an eight-member a cappella ensemble in Minnesota
 Cantus firmus, a pre-existing melody forming the basis of a polyphonic composition
 Cantus Records of Madrid, Spain
 Cantus the Minstrel, a character from Fraggle Rock
 Cantus may refer to the uppermost voice in medieval music manuscripts
 Cantus Verkehrsgesellschaft, a railway company in Germany
 Cantus (software)
 Cantus in Memoriam Benjamin Britten, a composition by Arvo Pärt
 Cantus (Norwegian female choir)
 Cantus, a song by 'Faith and the Muse' from their 1996 album Annwyn, Beneath the Waves
Hyundai Cantus, the name of the Hyundai Creta sport utility vehicle model in the Dominican Republic